is a 2001 real-time strategy puzzle video game developed and published by Nintendo for the GameCube. The game was created and produced by Shigeru Miyamoto, and is the first entry in the Pikmin series. The game's story focuses on an alien pilot, Captain Olimar, who crash lands on a mysterious planet and must make use of a native species called "Pikmin" to find his ship's missing parts in order to escape within 30 days. Players take control of Olimar and in directing the different varieties of Pikmin to exploring the game's various levels, overcoming obstacles and hostile creatures, in order to find and recover the missing ship parts.

The game was a critical and commercial success and spawned a series of sequels, starting with Pikmin 2, which was released in 2004.

Gameplay 

The main goal in the game is to retrieve ship parts by using the three varieties of Pikmin available in different combinations. Captain Olimar discovers multi-colored plant-animal hybrids that willingly follow his orders and help him recover the parts. All three of the Pikmin colors that Olimar discovers must be used in order to overcome various obstacles and complete the game. The Pikmin creatures come in three colors, including red, yellow and blue. Red Pikmin are the first type found in the game, resistant to fire and the strongest type of Pikmin with respect to combat. Yellow Pikmin can be thrown higher than the other two and can carry explosives called "bomb rocks" .  They are utilized in various tasks, including carrying objects and enemies, breaking down walls, and defeating enemies. Blue Pikmin are the only ones that are able to survive in water and throw Pikmin of other colors across it. Objects that can be carried vary between ship parts, enemy carcasses and pellets, which are brought back to a base camp established in the current zone, containing Olimar's ship and apparati representative of each kind of Pikmin called Onions, the latter which can convert carcasses and pellets to Pikmin seeds.  Only one hundred Pikmin, whether planted or plucked, can be on the ground at a time.

The time limit is divided into thirty days. With the exception of the first day, which lasts until the player finds the first ship part, all days in the game are about thirteen minutes in length, which can prematurely end at the player's request or if Olimar's health, replenished at his spacecraft, is depleted from attacks by native creatures.  The day also ends prematurely if all Pikmin in the zone go extinct, and the next day will begin with one new seed of every discovered kind of Pikmin.  By the end of each day, Olimar needs to stop all work and bring as many Pikmin as possible back to the base camp so that they can flee the planet's nocturnal predators in the safety of their Onions, as they also provide Pikmin shelter and transportation between zones; any Pikmin who do not make it back to base are eaten by said predators on each night prior to Olimar's last day on the planet.  At such time, Olimar will write a daily update to his ship log, which may be affected by events on that particular day, reflect on his efforts to escape, or provide useful gameplay hints.  As more parts are recovered, the ship regains functionality and can bring Olimar to up to four new zones on the planet to find the remaining parts.  The game has three different endings, depending on Olimar's progress in collecting ship parts. Collecting all thirty grants the best ending, while collecting at least the twenty-five mandatory parts within the 30-day time limit grants the normal ending. Failing to do so results in Olimar's ship's life support system failing and Olimar will die from oxygen poisoning.

Apart from the main gameplay, Pikmin also contains a Challenge Mode that is unlocked once Olimar gets all three types of Pikmin. Each of the five zones in the main game are available for play. The object of Challenge Mode is to grow the greatest number of Pikmin in one day as is possible.

At the final trial area there is the final boss, known as the “Emperor Bulbax”. You can beat this boss by throwing yellow bomb rock Pikmin into their mouth, and stunning them. They attack by using their large tongue, and jumping on to the Pikmin, killing several.

Plot 
In Pikmin, the main protagonist is Captain Olimar, a tiny, one-inch tall humanoid extraterrestrial from the planet Hocotate. The story starts when Olimar is taking an intergalactic vacation in outer space. However, during his flight, a comet hits his spacecraft, the S.S. Dolphin (a reference to the GameCube's codename, "Project Dolphin"), which is then pulled into the gravity field of an uncharted planet. Parts of the spaceship fall off as it plummets to the ground and crashes.

When he regains consciousness, Olimar finds out that the planet's atmosphere contains high levels of poisonous oxygen and he can stay on the planet for only thirty days before his life support system stops functioning. Olimar must retrieve all 30 of his lost spaceship parts so he can rebuild his spaceship and return to Hocotate. Although Olimar initially states in his journal entries that he needs all thirty parts, as the game progresses, it is hinted that some parts might not be needed to actually lift off and, indeed, one can successfully complete the game with only 25 parts rather than all 30.

To help Olimar are indigenous creatures called Pikmin, which are nearly extinct and unable to survive in the environment without direct leadership. As this element of symbiosis develops, Olimar discovers parts of the Dolphin and travels across the Pikmin Planet, which is assumed to be Earth, albeit with fictional fauna and far after the extinction of humans. The game has three endings depending upon how many ship parts the player successfully reacquires. Two good endings occur should the player retrieve all thirty parts or twenty-five necessary parts, and a bad ending occurs should the player fail to find twenty-five parts.

Development 
Pikmin was developed by Nintendo EAD and directed by Shigefumi Hino and Masamichi Abe (who had directed 1080° Snowboarding) and produced by Shigeru Miyamoto and Hiroyuki Kimura as one of the first Nintendo GameCube games. Miyamoto sketched the game as an idea centering around two characters called "Adam and Eve". They lived in a prehistoric world and players would observe their lives, with Miyamoto stating that players could "pretend to be God" and "give them love or make them fight". Players could make Adam and Eve build a nest and have children, eventually forming a village and increasing the number of controllable characters who could then be used to fight off giant creatures such as mammoths.

Colin Reed, who had programmed 1080° Snowboarding, programmed Pikmin. The foundation of Pikmin technology is in the animation and agency of a multitude of interacting characters. A technical demonstration called Super Mario 128 was shown at Nintendo Space World 2000, showing the performance of the prototype GameCube hardware by animating up to 128 copies of Mario at once. Miyamoto stated in 2007 that "most of you have already played [Super Mario 128] - but you played it in a game called Pikmin."

The development team of Pikmin expressed their initial trouble finding the game's direction. Hino explains:
 The score was composed by Hajime Wakai, who composed the music for Star Fox 64.

Pikmin was developed on Microsoft Windows. A Windows version of the game with debugging features is hidden on the GameCube version's disc.

Reception 

Upon being revealed at E3 2001, Pikmin garnered positive reception. IGN praised it for its uniqueness and its stunning graphics, with only a few negative points such as a poor camera. It was awarded the title of "Best Puzzle/Trivia/Parlor Game" from the Game Critics Awards, beating out ChuChu Rocket! for the Game Boy Advance. It was also runner-up for "Most Original Game", losing out to Majestic. It was a nominee for GameSpots annual "Best GameCube Game" and, among console games, "Most Innovative" awards. These went respectively to Super Smash Bros. Melee and Grand Theft Auto III.

Since its release for the Nintendo GameCube, Pikmin has received positive reception. It holds an average score of 89/100 from Metacritic. It was given the award for interactivity from the British Academy of Film and Television Arts. Pikmin has received significant praise for its graphics, in particular the design of the surrounding environment. Gaming Age editor Craig Majaski described Pikmin as both stunning and having a detailed environment. Brian McTaggart of the Houston Chronicle praised it for its graphics, gameplay, and originality, but criticized for being short. As of March 31, 2002, Pikmin has sold over one million copies.

Chris Slate reviewed the GameCube version of the game for Next Generation, rating it four stars out of five, and stated that "A charming, addictive game that backs up Nintendo's promise to innovate on GameCube. If you like puzzles, then get your thinking cap on and put those Pikmin to work."

The Wii re-release of Pikmin was not as well-received as the GameCube version, though it still had mostly positive reception; it holds an average score of 77/100 from Metacritic.

Sales 
In its first week, Pikmin sold more than 101,000 copies. However, sales fell to only between 10,000 and 15,000 copies in the weeks following. Following the release of "Ai no Uta" by Strawberry Flower, an image song related to Pikmin, its sales recovered slightly to about 22,000 copies in a week. The song appeared in the Japanese commercials for the game, but soon became an unexpected hit song, eventually eclipsing Pikmins sales. In the weeks of December 24, 2001 and January 6, 2002, Pikmin sold approximately 53,000 copies and 102,000 copies respectively. To date, Pikmin has sold at least 1.19 million copies worldwide; 680,000 in the United States and 507,011 in Japan. By January 3, 2010, the Wii version of Pikmin had sold 169,036 copies in Japan. Since its release, Pikmin has developed a vocal and devoted fanbase.

Re-release 
Pikmin and its sequel Pikmin 2 are part of the New Play Control series, a selection of GameCube video game remakes with additional support for features of the Wii. It was released on December 25, 2008 in Japan, February 6, 2009 in Europe and March 9, 2009 in North America (original version only). New Play Control! Pikmin uses the Wii Remote, and requires the player to point and click on the screen to do various tasks instead of manually moving a cursor with a control stick. It was also announced that the game saves day-by-day records of the player's playthrough, allowing the player to restart from any recorded day of their choice. In an interview, director Shigefumi Hino stated that besides adding motion controls, they wanted to include the ability to go back to saves they have made in the past, allowing players to replay all 30 days one by one in order to improve.

Notes

References

External links 
 
 
 Pikmin on Play.Nintendo.com

New Play Control! games
2001 video games
Interactive Achievement Award winners
GameCube games
Cancelled Nintendo 64 games
Pikmin
Wii games
Wii games re-released on the Nintendo eShop
Real-time strategy video games
Video games developed in Japan
Video games with alternate endings
Video games set on fictional planets
Works about vacationing
Single-player video games